The Haima S7 or Haima 7 is a SUV that is manufactured by the Chinese manufacturer Haima.

Overview
The Haima S7 debuted at the 2010 Auto China show as the Haima 7 and is being sold since July 2010 in China. The Haima S7 is powered by a 2.0-litre four-cylinder engine developing 150 hp and 180 nm with a top speed of  mated to a 5-speed manual transmission and a later added 5-speed automatic transmission. The acceleration of the S7 from 0 to 100 km/h is 14.9 seconds.

2013 facelift
A name change to Haima S7 was done in 2011 and a subtle facelift was received in 2013. The facelifted model debuted on the Shanghai Auto Show in April 2013.

2015 facelift
The vehicle was revised and facelifted for the second time in 2015, and a third facelift launched on the Chinese car market in October 2016.

References

External links

 http://www.cinaautoparts.com

Haima vehicles
FAW Group vehicles
Cars of China
Crossover sport utility vehicles
Compact sport utility vehicles
Cars introduced in 2010